A chicken shack is a restaurant that primarily serves chicken, usually fried.

The term may also refer to:
Chicken Shack, English blues band
Chick'n Shack, Shake Shack chicken sandwich
Harold's Chicken Shack, American restaurant chain in Chicago, Illinois
Chicken Shack (Michigan), American restaurant chain in metro Detroit, Michigan
Jimmie's Chicken Shack, American alternative rock band from Annapolis, Maryland
"Chicken Shack Boogie", 1948 jump blues song by Amos Milburn
Back at the Chicken Shack, 1960 album by jazz organist Jimmy Smith
"Back at the Chicken Shack" (song), song by organist Jimmy Smith, covered by many artists

See also 

 Chicken coop, housing for chickens